Carl McAdams (born April 26, 1944) is a former American football linebacker who played professionally in the American Football League (AFL) from 1967 through 1969.  He was an All-American at the University of Oklahoma and an integral part of the AFL and Super Bowl champion New York Jets in 1968. When McAdams signed with the Jets, it was the largest contract for a lineman until that point.

References

1944 births
Living people
American football linebackers
New York Jets players
Oklahoma Sooners football players
All-American college football players
People from Dumas, Texas
American Football League players